The 1999 Wychavon District Council election took place on 6 May 1999 to elect members of Wychavon District Council in Worcestershire, England. The whole council was up for election and the Conservative Party gained overall control of the council from no overall control.

Background
Before the election the Conservatives were the largest party on the council with 18 seats, but the Liberal Democrats with 17 seats ran the council with the support of the 10 Labour councillors and there were also 4 independent councillors. 49 seats were up for election in 1999, but the Conservatives won two seats in Harvington and Norton and Wickhamford without opposition.

Election result
The Conservatives gained 11 seats to take control of the council with 29 councillors, in only the second time after 1987 that the Conservatives won a majority on the council. Both the Liberal Democrat leader of the council, John Grantham, and the Labour group leader John Wrenn were among the councilors to be defeated at the election.

Ward results

By-elections between 1999 and 2003

Evesham East
A by-election was held in Evesham East on 9 November 2000 after the resignation of Labour councillor Richard Hicks. The seat was gained for the Conservatives by Andy Dyke with a majority of 25 votes over Labour candidate Steve Selby.

Dodderhill
A by-election was held in Dodderhill on 16 May 2002 after the death of Conservative councillor Charles Richardson. The seat was held for the Conservatives by Judith Pearce with a majority of 58 votes over independent candidate Warren Lewis.

Drakes Broughton
A by-election was held in Drakes Broughton on 18 July 2002 following the resignation of Liberal Democrat councillor Ralph Mason. The seat was gained for the Conservatives by Paul Middlebrough with a 3-vote majority over Liberal Democrat Josephine Wilkinson.

References

1999
1999 English local elections
1990s in Worcestershire